The Herd is the eighth studio album by punk rock band Wipers, released in 1996 by the label Tim/Kerr. The album was written, produced and recorded by Sage at his own Zeno Studios in Phoenix, Arizona.

Track listing 
All songs written by Greg Sage.
 "Psychic Vampire" – 3:42
 "No Place Safe" – 4:02
 "Last Chance" – 3:25
 "Wind the Clock Slowly" – 3:28
 "The Herd" – 4:01
 "Stormy" – 3:14
 "Green Light Legion" – 3:14
 "Sinking as a Stone" – 4:08
 "Sunrise" – 3:17
 "Defiant" – 3:38
 "Resist" – 3:28
 "Insane" – 3:03

Personnel 
Adapted from the liner notes:

 Greg Sage: vocals, guitar, production, recording
 Steve Plouf: drums
 Galen Showman: artwork
 Steven Birch: layout

References

1996 albums
Wipers albums